Face the People is a Philippine tabloid talk show  aired on TV5 and presented by Gelli de Belen and Christine Bersola-Babao. It is the revamp of now-defunct Face to Face, carrying its format. Face The People will set to premiere on October 14, 2013  and airs Mondays to Fridays, 4:30pm – 5:30pm, as part of a larger primetime weekday block titled Everyday All The Way. Amy Perez & Roderick Paulate was the original host, but resigned to take care of her child (and eventually transferred to ABS-CBN to the host of The Singing Bee), with Bersola-Babao as the replacement.

The former Trio Tagapayo of Face-to-Face return as a Konsensya ng Bayan to give good advice and counselling to resolve the visitors' issues and problems in Face The People. Atty. Karen Jimeno and Coach Jaret Pulido are also included as a Konsensya ng Bayan. It will form into three depends who will changed in an episode.

The show's recent season was ended on June 6, 2014 with a new set of episode set to air on July 7, 2014, with Edu Manzano joining in as a new co-host and the show moved to its morning timeslot at 10:15am. However, the program ended on November 21, 2014 alongside Let's Ask Pilipinas. Both programs were replaced by Infinity Nado and Movie Max 5, respectively. In January 2015, legal advice show Solved na Solved which de Belen hosted with Arnell Ignacio and Far Eastern University Institute of Law Dean and Relasyon host Atty. Mel Sta. Maria, replaced Face The People together with Healing Galing sa TV5 and Happy Wife, Happy Life.

The show is streaming online on YouTube.

Hosts
 Gelli de Belen (2013–2014)
 Christine Bersola-Babao (2013–2014; Happy Change Segment Host)
 Edu Manzano (2014)

Guest co-host
 Marvin Agustin (2014)

Konsensya ng Bayan
Atty. Persida Acosta (Public Attorney's Office head)
Atty. Benedicto Acosta (University of the East College of Law Professor, husband of Atty. Persida)
Atty. Karen Jimeno
Dr. Camille Garcia
Fr. Sonny Mérida 
Coach Jaret Pulido

Censorship
All episodes of "Face the People" are censored, regardless of time.

Initially, mainly profanity was bleeped and pixelated, but later episodes were bleeped for explicit language, sometimes to such an exit. The audience is not allowed to shout anything that encourages or sustains violence among the guests.

Furniture may be pushed aside, but the chairs are purposely large to preclude their use as a weapon.

See also
 List of programs broadcast by TV5 (Philippines)
 List of programs aired by TV5 (Philippines)

References

External links
 

TV5 (Philippine TV network) original programming
2013 Philippine television series debuts
2014 Philippine television series endings
Philippine television talk shows
Filipino-language television shows
LGBT-related controversies in television
Television controversies in the Philippines